Certain words in the English language represent animal sounds: the noises and vocalizations of particular animals, especially noises used by animals for communication. The words can be used as verbs or interjections in addition to nouns, and many of them are also specifically onomatopoeic.

List of animal sounds

See also 

 Animal communication
 Animal epithet
 Animal language
 Bioacoustics
 Cat organ & piganino
 Cross-linguistic onomatopoeias
 Field recording
 List of animal names
 List of onomatopoeias
 "Old MacDonald Had a Farm"
 "The Fox (What Does the Fox Say?)"

References

External links 

 List of animal sounds to download, listen and use for free.
 Multilingual list of animal sounds Derek Abbott, University of Adelaide

 
Linguistics lists
Zoosemiotics